Rear Admiral Richard George Heaslip CB (born 30 April 1932) is a former Royal Navy officer who served as Flag Officer Submarines.

Naval career
Educated at Chichester High School, Heaslip became commanding officer of the submarine HMS Conqueror in 1971 and commanding officer of the submarine HMS Valiant and also Captain of the 2nd Submarine Squadron in 1975, and in that role took part in the Queen's Silver Jubilee Fleet Review in June 1977. He went on to be Director of Defence Policy (Naval) in March 1982 and in that role provided policy advice during the Falklands War before becoming Flag Officer Submarines in November 1984 and retiring in May 1987. He was appointed a Companion of the Order of the Bath on 1 January 1987.
 
In retirement Heaslip became Director-General of the English-Speaking Union.

Family
In 1959 Heaslip married Lorna Jean Grayston; they have three sons and one daughter.

References

1932 births
Living people
Royal Navy rear admirals
Companions of the Order of the Bath